Platydoras costatus, the Raphael catfish, is a species of thorny catfish native to rivers in Suriname and French Guiana. It was long confused with other species in the genus Platydoras, especially the more widespread "true" striped Raphael catfish (P. armatulus). P. costatus grows to a length of  SL, and unlike P. armatulus the light stripe along the body of P. costatus does not extend onto the head. This fish is a minor component of local fisheries and is also found in the aquarium trade.

References

Doradidae
Fish of South America
Fish described in 1758
Taxa named by Carl Linnaeus